: may refer to:

People
 Umegatani Tōtarō II, a sumo yokozuna, known by the elder name of Ikazuchi
 Kakizoe Tōru, sumo wrestler known by the elder name of Ikazuchi as of 2019

Naval ships
, a class of six torpedo boat destroyers operated by the Imperial Japanese Navy (IJN) from 1899 to 1921
, a class of two destroyer escorts operated by the Japan Maritime Self-Defense Force from 1956 to 1977
, four destroyers of the Imperial Japanese Navy and the Japan Maritime Self-Defense Force

In fiction 
Ikazuchi-class carrier, a fictional class of spaceships in the Robotech saga
Den-Liner Ikazuchi, a dragon-style train used by the titular character of the Japanese tokusatsu series Kamen Rider Den-O
Ikazuchi-Maru, a character in the 1966 ninja fantasy film The Magic Serpent
Ikazuchi, the flagship of the Taraak Imperial Fleet in the Vandread anime series
Ikazuchi, a character in the Japanese tokusatsu series Kamen Rider Zero-One
Raimeiken Ikazuchi, the sword of Kamen Rider Espada, a character from the Japanese tokusatsu series Kamen Rider Saber

See also
Thunder (disambiguation)
Inazuma (disambiguation)
Raiden (disambiguation)